Sand sharks, also known as sand tiger sharks, gray nurse sharks or ragged tooth sharks, are mackerel sharks of the family Odontaspididae. They are found worldwide in temperate and tropical waters. The three species are in two genera.

Description

The body tends to be brown with dark markings in the upper half. These markings disappear as they mature. Their needle-like teeth are highly adapted for impaling fish, their main prey. Their teeth are long, narrow, and very sharp with smooth edges, with one and on occasion two smaller cusplets on either side. Sand sharks have a large second dorsal fin. The average lifespan of both sexes is only about 7 years, though they may live longer in captivity.

Location and origins
The name sand shark comes from their tendency to migrate towards shoreline habitats, and they are often seen swimming around the ocean floor in the surf zone; at times, they come very close to shore. They are often found in warm or temperate waters throughout the world's oceans, except the eastern Pacific.

Behavior
The sand shark has a unique hunting strategy. It is able to gulp air from above the surface and collect the air in its stomach. This enables it to become buoyant and approach its prey virtually motionless. During the day, the sand shark stays mostly inactive, but at night, it becomes active and resumes hunting activities. Its staple is small fish, but it eats crustaceans and squid, as well. It occasionally hunts in shivers (groups), and has even been known to attack full fishing nets.

Reproduction
Sand sharks only develop two embryos, one in each uterus. The largest and strongest embryos consume their siblings in the womb (intrauterine cannibalism) before each surviving pup is born. It has one of the lowest reproduction rates of all sharks and is susceptible to even minimal population pressure, so it is listed as vulnerable and is protected in much of its range.

Attacks on people
Sand sharks are not known to attack humans. If a person were to provoke a sand shark, it may retaliate defensively. Sand sharks are generally not aggressive, but  harass divers who are spearfishing. In North America, wreck divers regularly visit the World War II shipwrecks to dive with the   sharks that make the wrecks their home.

Conservation

A recent report from the PEW Charitable Trusts suggests a new management approach used for large mammals that have suffered population declines could hold promise for sharks. Because of the life-history characteristics of sharks, conventional fisheries management approaches, such as reaching maximum sustainable yield, may not be sufficient to rebuild depleted shark populations. Some of the more stringent approaches used to reverse declines in large mammals may be appropriate for sharks, including prohibitions on the retention of the most vulnerable species and regulation of international trade.

Species
 
The family contains three extant species, in two genera, as well as many extinct species in several genera. Recent mitochondrial DNA analysis of extant members has found the two extant members do not actually form a monophyletic clade. This family is therefore polyphyletic and in need of revision.
 Genus Carcharias Rafinesque, 1810
 Carcharias taurus Rafinesque, 1810 (sand tiger shark) 
Genus Odontaspis Agassiz 1838
 Odontaspis ferox A. Risso, 1810 (smalltooth sand tiger)
 Odontaspis noronhai Maul, 1955 (bigeye sand tiger)
 Subfamily Odontaspinae † Herman, 1975 
Genus Striatolamia † Glikman, 1964 
Genus Carcharoides † Ameghino, 1901
Genus Parodontaspis † White, 1931
Genus Priodontaspis † Ameghino, 1901
Genus Pseudoisurus † Glikman, 1957
Genus Synodontaspis † White, 1931
Subfamily Johnlonginae † Shimada, 2015
Genus Johnlongia †
Genus Pseudomegachasma † (Shimada, 2015)

References

External links
 FishBase Family Odontaspididae - Sand tigers. fishbase.org
 Sand Tiger Shark School
 Sand Tigers Sharks
 Shark Info
 Scuba divers swim among the sharks, Fayetteville Observer

 
Ovoviviparous fish
Extant Late Cretaceous first appearances
Taxa named by Friedrich Gustav Jakob Henle